Acker and Evans Law Office (also known as Ogdensburg Bank) is a historic office building in Ogdensburg, New York, United States.  It is a rectangular Greek Revival style structure with a facade of smooth-faced, locally quarried white marble.  It was built about 1830 as a bank, then used as a ticket agency, insurance office, express office, and finally as a law office.

It was listed on the National Register of Historic Places in 1983.

See also 
 Clinton–Rosekrans Law Building: NRHP listing in Greene (Village), New York
 Heermance House and Law Office: NRHP listing in Rhinecliff, New York
 National Register of Historic Places listings in St. Lawrence County, New York

References

Office buildings on the National Register of Historic Places in New York (state)
Commercial buildings completed in 1830
Buildings and structures in St. Lawrence County, New York
1830 establishments in New York (state)
National Register of Historic Places in St. Lawrence County, New York
Law offices
Bank buildings on the National Register of Historic Places in New York (state)
Greek Revival architecture in New York (state)
Legal history of New York (state)